Ariyalur district is an administrative district, one of the 38 districts in the state of Tamil Nadu in India. The district headquarters is located at Ariyalur. The district encompasses an area of 1,949.31 km².

Gangaikonda Cholapuram, built by King Rajendra Cholan of Chola Empire, is a UNESCO World Heritage site situated in this district. The district is also known for its rich prehistoric fossils. Many fossils of gigantic molluscs and jawed fishes, at least one fossilized dinosaur egg, and several fragmentary fossils of sauropod and theropod dinosaurs have been discovered here. An on-site museum is being set up at Keelapazhur to preserve and conserve fossils.  Ariyalur is noted for its cement industries and Jayankondam has huge reserves of lignite.

History

In 1995, Tiruchirappalli was trifurcated and the Perambalur and Karur districts were formed. Ariyalur district was carved out of Perambalur district on 1 January 2001. But, it was merged with Perambalur district on 31 March 2002. Ariyalur district was re-carved on 23 November 2007. The district is bordered by the districts of Cuddalore to the north and north-east, Mayiladuthurai to the east, Thanjavur to the south and south-east, Tiruchirapalli to the south-west and Perambalur to the west.

Brihadeeswarar Temple, Gangaikondacholapuram 
Brihadisvara Temple at Gangaikonda Cholapuram is a Hindu temple dedicated to Shiva in Gangaikonda Cholapuram, Jayankondam, in the South Indian state of Tamil Nadu. Completed in 1035 AD by Rajendra Chola I as a part of his new capital, this Chola dynasty era temple is similar in design, and has a similar name, as the older 11th century, Brihadeeswarar Temple about 70 km (43 mi) to the southwest in Thanjavur. The Gangaikonda Cholapuram Temple is smaller yet more refined than the Thanjavur Temple. Both are among the largest Shiva temples in South India and examples of Dravidian style temples.

Demographics

According to the 2011 census, Ariyalur district has a population of 754,894, roughly equal to the nation of Guyana or the US state of Alaska. This gives it a ranking of 491 in India (out of a total of 640). Its population growth rate over the decade 2001–2011 was 8.19%. Ariyalur has a sex ratio of 1016 females for every 1000 males, and a literacy rate of 71.99%. 11.01% of the population lives in urban areas. Scheduled Castes and Scheduled Tribes make up 23.34% and 1.42% of the population, respectively. As of 2011 it is the third least populous district of Tamil Nadu (out of 32), after Perambalur and Nilgiris. Jayankondam is the most populated town in Ariyalur district. Tamil is the predominant language, spoken by 99.27% of the population.

Politics 

|}

Important places
 Gangaikonda Cholapuram
 Kallathur
 Jayankondam
 Karaivetti Bird Sanctuary
 Thirumalapadi
 Kamarasavalli
 Govindaputtur
 Fossil Museum 
 Vikkiramangalam
 Ariyalur – Kodandarmaswamy Kovil
 Elakurichi Church
 Kallankurichi Kaliya Perumal Kovil

See also
 List of districts of Tamil Nadu
 List of villages in Ariyalur district

References

External links

Ariyalur District Official WebSite
Ariyalur District Police

 
Districts of Tamil Nadu
2001 establishments in Tamil Nadu